Group G may refer to:

 A set of international motor racing regulations used in touring car racing
 One of eight groups of four teams competing at the FIFA World Cup
 2022 FIFA World Cup Group G
 2018 FIFA World Cup Group G
 2014 FIFA World Cup Group G
 2010 FIFA World Cup Group G
 2006 FIFA World Cup Group G
 2002 FIFA World Cup Group G
 1998 FIFA World Cup Group G
 A Belgian resistance group of World War II, Groupe G